Horace Arthur Jones (born July 31, 1949) is a former professional American football player who played defensive end for six seasons for the Oakland Raiders and the Seattle Seahawks.

1949 births
Living people
Players of American football from Pensacola, Florida
American football defensive ends
Louisville Cardinals football players
Oakland Raiders players
Seattle Seahawks players